Gintarė Adomaitytė (born 30 January 1957 in Kaunas) is a Lithuanian journalist. 

She graduated from Vilnius University in 1980. From 1994–1998 she worked on the magazine DZIĘCIOŁ.

References

Lithuanian journalists
Lithuanian women journalists
1957 births
Living people
Writers from Kaunas
Vilnius University alumni
Lithuanian screenwriters
20th-century Lithuanian women writers
20th-century Lithuanian writers
21st-century Lithuanian women writers
21st-century Lithuanian writers